The 2015 Wagner Seahawks football team represents Wagner College in the 2015 NCAA Division I FCS football season as a member of the Northeast Conference (NEC). They were led by first-year head coach Jason Houghtaling and played their home games at Wagner College Stadium. They finished the season 1–10 overal and 1–5 in NEC play to place seventh.

Schedule

References

Wagner
Wagner Seahawks football seasons
Wagner Seahawks football